AWQAF Africa (also known or referred to as AWQAF or The Awqaf) serves all countries of Africa: South, North, West, East, and other territorial geography of the continent including its islands in the Indian and Atlantic oceans and Mediterranean Sea, as well as the West Indies.  Awqaf Africa, from time to time, extends its works to all Muslims outside the continent - especially in the Muslim World.  Awqaf Africa carries out its projects in all parts of the world globalizing under the banner of Islam.

Origin
Awqaf Africa was founded, while studying Postgraduate Degrees in Damascus early 1990s by Sheikh Abu-Abdullah Adelabu, PhD (Damas), a West African Muslim scholar and cleric of Nigerian origin who is the international organization's first al Amir (i.e., president).

Nature and Activities
Awqaf Africa is an international organization which is incorporated in its structure with African Union Muslim working to relieve human suffering amongst the Muslims of Africa - in particular and as a primary objective - and around the world - as necessary.  The aim is projected for all nations of the continent, especially, their Muslim societies where each national society effectuates programmes of Awqaf Africa.  Relief, human dignity, and spiritual uplift remain main goals of the international body. Through education at its Awqaf Africa Muslim Open College in London, the organization seeks the causes of suffering, poverty, and Islamophobia and tries to eliminate them under the amiable banner of Islam.

Education
The organization says it projected the Open College with the aim of providing, particularly, Muslims of African origins with studies and qualifications that enable them to serve themselves and their Muslim communities.  Awqaf Africa's college offers its people an alternative means of learning with maximum flexibility, in order that they can build a program of studies that fits both their personal and community needs and adapt accordingly. Awqaf Africa gives priority to those who serve or intend to serve the Muslim communities through teachings and preachings or administration and career development.  Projects supported by Awqaf Africa include the Muslim portals EsinIslam.com and IslamAfrica.com.

Status
Awqaf Africa is an independent establishment with a firm principle to stay neutral and distance itself from exploitations by politicians, lobbies from prominent business, or affiliations with military struggles.  Awqaf Africa maintains Jihad or Struggling For The Cause of Islam is a faith as well as a duty, and therefore does not champion any struggling other than that of Islam.

References

Year of establishment missing

Islamic organisations based in the United Kingdom
Religion in Africa
Religious organizations established in the 1990s